Adolfo Jorge Bullrich (30 December 1833 - 8 March 1904) was a military and merchant Argentine who became Mayor of the City of Buenos Aires between 1898 and 1902, during the first part of the second presidency of Julio Argentino Roca.

Adolfo Jorge Bullrich was born in 1833, son of Augusto Bullrich, a German who had arrived in Buenos Aires as a prisoner of war, caught as an enemy soldier during the War of Brazil, and after his release had settled in the city.

References 

Mayors of Buenos Aires
1833 births
1904 deaths
Argentine people of German descent
20th-century Argentine politicians
19th-century politicians